Goldthorpe is a village in the Metropolitan Borough of Barnsley, in South Yorkshire, England. Historically part of the West Riding of Yorkshire. It was anciently a small medieval farming village, Goldthorpe is recorded in the Domesday Book a part of the Manor of Bolton upon Dearne which was once owned by Roger de Busli. The village is in the Dearne North Ward of Barnsley MBC and had a population of 6,051 at the 2011 Census.

History

Early prehistoric pottery, a flint flake, Bronze Age cremation sites and Romano-British ditches and field systems have been found in the Goldthorpe area suggesting ancient occupation of the area over a long period of time.

Goldthorpe is recorded in the 1761–1767 Inclosure Awards. The Marsden family held the manor until 1815.

St John and St Mary Magdalene Church, Goldthorpe, built in 1916, is an early example of a ferro-concrete building. According to Nikolaus Pevsner, the pulpit bought by the church in 1931 is 18th-century Flemish.

Goldthorp, Goldthorpe, Gouldthorpe and all variations of this surname, derive from this placename. A marriage took place in 1361, when Robert de Goldthorpe alias Robertson, son of Robert Lord of the Manor of Goldthorpe married Esabul de Shepley daughter of William de Shepley, half heiress with her sister Dionyssia to the Manor of Shepley. Descendants took the surname Goldthorpe remaining major land owners for almost 200 years, until the final heir sold up and left the area. Cadet branches remained in the Huddersfield area for many centuries mainly as wool weavers.

Economy
The area is now commonly referred to as the Dearne Valley and was a major coal mining area.

In 1984 two teenage boys had died in Goldthorpe while collecting coal during the strike; a memorial to them was built in 2011.

Facilities
Goldthorpe railway station opened in 1988 on the Wakefield Line.

Goldthorpe Market is located in the middle of town, next to the library. The current market day is Monday.

Goldthorpe Library is a modern building (the previous library having been burnt down in an arson attack) in the middle of the town.

There is no longer a Goldthorpe Town Centre. It was replaced with Dearne Goldthorpe Primary School, which has since moved. The area is currently having plans being made to construct something else to help the community.

Schools
The main secondary school in the area is Astrea Academy Dearne, a school that caters for around 1,300 pupils aged 11–16 years. There are three main primary schools: Dearne Goldthorpe Primary School (3–11, community school), Dearne Highgate Primary School (3–11, community school) and Sacred Heart Catholic Primary School (3–11, voluntary aided school).

Sports
Goldthorpe was represented in the FA Cup during the 1920s and 1930s by Goldthorpe United F.C. Goldthorpe is home to Dearne CC, a cricket club established in 1926 and currently playing in Division 5 of the South Yorkshire Senior Cricket League.

Notable residents
The actor Brian Blessed once lived on Probert Avenue in Goldthorpe.

See also
List of Yorkshire pits
Listed buildings in Dearne North

References

External links

The Inclosure Awards of 1761–67 for Bolton on Dearne with Goldthorpe

Villages in South Yorkshire
Geography of the Metropolitan Borough of Barnsley